The T4 Holin Family (TC# 1.E.8) is a group of putative pore-forming proteins that does not belong to one of the seven holin superfamilies. T-even phage such as T4 use a holin-endolysin system for host cell lysis. Although the endolysin of phage T4 encoded by the e gene (Lysozyme E) was identified in 1961, the holin (product of gene t and called T-holin) was not characterized until 2001. A representative list of proteins belonging to the T4 holin family can be found in the Transporter Classification Database.

Structure 
T4 holin is fairly large, about 218 amino acyl residues (aas) in length. The protein is highly hydrophilic with 49 acidic and basic residues distributed along its length and a single putative transmembrane segment (TMS) near its N-terminus, leaving most of the protein in the periplasm.

Function 
The large periplasmic domain is a major determinant in the timing mechanism and is involved in lysis inhibition (LIN). LIN involves the antiholin rI protein of T4 (See TC# 1.E.8.1.1). Lysis inhibition is an effective strategy to coordinate lysis timing with phage particle maturation and to exclude other phage. The C-terminal periplasmic domain of T4 holin binds the periplasmic domain of T4 antiholin (RI; 97 aas) which like the holin, spans the membrane once. T-holin of T4 phage forms a 1:1 complex with the RI inhibitor which block aggregation and pore formation.

Homology 
The phage T4 T-holin (lysis protein) is identical to the holin from phage K3 and nearly identical to that from phage ARI. Residues 35-96 are 28% identical to residues 436-495 of a K+ uptake protein of Lactococcus lactis (gbAAK04721; TC# 2.A.72; KUP), suggesting an evolutionary relationship between a holin and a transporter. Holins have 1 to 4 TMSs and a short C-terminal domain rich in basic residues.

See also 
 Holin
 Lysin
 Transporter Classification Database

References

Further reading 

Protein families
Membrane proteins
Transmembrane proteins
Transmembrane transporters
Transport proteins
Integral membrane proteins
Holins